Tony Meola's Sidekicks Soccer is a traditional soccer (football) simulation video game released for the Super Nintendo Entertainment System in 1993. It is named after US goalkeeper Tony Meola. In Brazil, there is also a version called Worldwide Soccer, but it is not modified like Super Copa, it is just the same US version.

Gameplay

The teams in the game include various national teams and some unlicensed club teams from Europe, Japan and America. Players can play with teams from different parts of the United States, including Miami, Los Angeles, Sacramento.

Mode 7 is used to achieve a pseudo-3D effect similar to that of Sculptured Software's previous NCAA Basketball. There are various options and features; including a variety of soccer formations, corner kicks, and the ability to alter each team's roster.

Reception

In their November 1993 issue of Game Players, the magazine assigned this video game a rating of 72%. Allgame would assign this game a rating of 3.5 stars out of 5.

References

 Tony Meola's Sidekicks Soccer at GameFAQs
 Tony Meola's Sidekicks Soccer at MobyGames
 Tony Meola's Sidekicks Soccer at allgame

External links
 Ramos Rui no World Wide Soccer at superfamicom.org
 ラモス瑠偉のワールドワイドサッカー / Ramos Rui no World Wide Soccer at super-famicom.jp 

1993 video games
Association football video games
Electro Brain games
Pack-In-Video games
Super Nintendo Entertainment System games
Super Nintendo Entertainment System-only games
Sports video games set in the United States
Multiplayer and single-player video games
Video games developed in the United States
Video games based on real people
Cultural depictions of association football players
Cultural depictions of American men